Wadderhatti  is a village in the southern state of Karnataka, India. It is located in the Koppal taluk of Koppal district in Karnataka.

See also
 Koppal
 Districts of Karnataka

References

External links
 http://Koppal.nic.in/

Villages in Koppal district